Mentor Township may refer to the following places in the United States:

 Mentor Township, Cheboygan County, Michigan
 Mentor Township, Oscoda County, Michigan
 Mentor Township, Divide County, North Dakota in Divide County, North Dakota
 Mentor Township, Lake County, Ohio, former township incorporated into the cities of Mentor and Mentor-on-the-Lake and a portion of the village of Kirtland Hills

See also

 
 Mentor (disambiguation)

Township name disambiguation pages